The Walla Theater on Central Ave. in  Walhalla, North Dakota was built in 1949. It was designed by Minnesota architect Perry Crosier in Moderne style. It was listed on the National Register of Historic Places in 2010.

References

Theatres on the National Register of Historic Places in North Dakota
Moderne architecture in the United States
Theatres completed in 1949
National Register of Historic Places in Pembina County, North Dakota
1949 establishments in North Dakota